The Russia national rugby union team (Russian: Сборная России по регби), nicknamed Medvedi (The Bears), represented Russia in men's international rugby union international competitions. The team is administered by the Rugby Union of Russia (RUR). The RUR is considered the official successor union of the Soviet Union by World Rugby and the combined CIS team which played in the early 1990s. Since 1992, the team has played as Russia. Its first test match as Russia was against the Barbarians in Moscow in June 1992 and the country's first test against an official Test nation was against Belgium later that same year.

Russia is seen as a Tier 2 union by World Rugby. The team's regular international competition was in the Rugby Europe Championship – often referred to as the Six Nations B. In addition, the team participated in World Rugby-run summer tournaments including the Nations Cup, the dormant Churchill Cup, and other international fixtures.

Russia competed in their first Rugby World Cup (RWC) in New Zealand in 2011 after qualifying as Europe 2 through their second-place finish in the 2009–10 ENC. Russia played in Pool C and finished fifth, scoring one point. Previous qualification campaigns saw elimination to Portugal ahead of the 2007 tournament, and expulsion from 2003 qualifying for Russia's breaches of eligibility rules. The team also unsuccessfully attempted to qualify for the 1995 and 1999 Rugby World Cups. They competed in the 2019 Rugby World Cup in Japan by qualifying as Europe 1 as a result of Spain, Romania and Belgium being eliminated.

After the 2022 Russian invasion of Ukraine, World Rugby and Rugby Europe suspended Russia from international and European continental rugby union competition. In addition, the Rugby Union of Russia was suspended from World Rugby and Rugby Europe.

History

The Rugby Union of the Soviet Union was founded in 1936, although the national side did not play its first official international until 1974. 

The Soviet Union took time to establish itself, but by the mid-1980s was regularly beating the likes of Italy and Romania. The team was invited to the inaugural 1987 Rugby World Cup, but declined on political grounds, not least the continued IRB membership of apartheid South Africa. Following the breakup of the USSR, Russian players played for the interim Commonwealth of Independent States team, which played four matches during 1991 and 1992.

The first game played by the new Russian national team took place on June 6, 1992, when Russia beat the Barbarians 27–23. Russia's first game against a full IRB member was versus Belgium four months later in the 1992/4 FIRA-AER European Trophy. That edition of the tournament saw Russia secure its first, and to-date only, win over Georgia. Russia continued to participate until realignment of FIRA-AER competitions in 2000.

The Russian national side has since played its regular competitive rugby in FIRA-AER's European Nations Cup, the second level mirror tournament to the Six Nations. Russia replaced Morocco in the top tier in 2001 and have stayed there ever since. The Russian side has yet to win the title. The team has played in the now-defunct Superpowers Cup, winning the tournament once, the Nations Cup, the Churchill Cup, and most recently the IRB's International Rugby Series. The RUR attempted to gain greater participation in the autumn test window, and was being integrated into World Rugby's global test match schedule.

After the 2022 Russian invasion of Ukraine, World Rugby and Rugby Europe suspended Russia from international and European continental rugby union competition. In addition, the Rugby Union of Russia was suspended from World Rugby and Rugby Europe.

Rugby World Cup

World Cup record

Early qualifying attempts (1987 – 2007)
The Soviet Union declined to take up its invite to take part in the inaugural 1987 Rugby World Cup on the basis of the IRB membership by apartheid South Africa. The Soviet Rugby Union was not an IRB member in time for 1991 Rugby World Cup qualifying.

In qualifying for the 1995 Rugby World Cup, the first in which the national side was involved, Russia came through preliminary qualifying with wins over Poland and Georgia, before beating Germany but losing to Romania for the Eastern Europe spot. In European qualifying for the 1999 Rugby World Cup, Russia finished fourth in Pool 1 in Round B, which was not enough to progress from a group also including Italy, Georgia, Croatia, and Denmark.

The Russian national side was expelled from qualifying for the 2003 Rugby World Cup, due to eligibility issues. Spain, who Russia had beaten in qualifying, protested the fielding of three South African-born players (Johan Hendriks, Reiner Volschenck and Werner Pieterse), whom the RUR claimed had qualified through ancestry. However, the RUR did not produce documentation deemed acceptable by the IRB, and Spain were re-instated in qualification in Russia's place.

In 2007 Rugby World Cup qualifying, Russia came through European qualifying to a mini-group stage where they were pooled with Italy and Portugal. The winner would qualify directly and the second place team would continue the qualification process, with the third-placed team eliminated. After both losing heavily to Italy, Portugal and Russia met to determine progression to qualifying round 5. Russia lost the match, played in Lisbon, 26–23 and dropped out.

2011
Russia qualified for the 2011 Rugby World Cup in New Zealand as Europe 2 after finishing second in the 2008–10 European Nations Cup. This marked the team's World Cup debut, with Russia becoming the 25th side to play at the tournament, where they faced Australia, Ireland, Italy and the United States in Group C of the tournament.

2015

The Russian national rugby union team finished third in European qualifying for the 2015 Rugby World Cup. The top two teams in the final group— Georgia and Romania — immediately qualified for the 2015 tournament. Russia, as third-place finisher in the final group, faced Uruguay in a home-and-away two-game playoff. Uruguay won on aggregate and secured the 20th and final qualifying spot for the 2015 tournament, with Russia failing to qualify.

2019

The Russian national rugby union team once again finished third in European qualifying for the 2019 Rugby World Cup. However, after a controversial game played by Belgium and Spain (which was originally intended to be replayed), the issue of three teams in the group stage fielding ineligible players (Belgium, Romania, and Spain) was investigated by World Rugby and Rugby Europe. It was determined that all three teams had violated eligibility rules and gained an unfair advantage (both Romania and Spain defeated Russia) and were sanctioned, and thus, Russia advanced as the automatic qualifier, with Germany headed to the repechage against Portugal.

European Nations Cup
As the Soviet Union, the side secured four straight silvers (all behind France and ahead of Italy and Romania) during the 1980s, and three bronzes. Russia first played the FIRA Trophy in the 1992–94 season. Since 2000, Russia's primary international competition is the European Nations Cup, administered by Rugby Europe and played, by-and-large, during the Six Nations international release window in February and March. Russia won the inaugural Division 2 competition, winning promotion to the top tier in 2000, where they have remained ever since. Since realignment, Russia has secured two runners-up spots and three third-place finishes.

In the 2011-12 season, Russia finished fourth with five wins and five losses. In the 2013-14 season, the team finished third with six wins and four losses. In the 2015-16 season, the Bears again claimed six wins and four losses to finish third. In the 2017 season, Russia finished fourth with two wins and three losses.

Players

Current squad
On the 23rd of January 2022, the following 26 players were called up for the 2022 Rugby Europe Championship.

On the 24th of January, Vasily Artemyev was called up to the squad. On the 26th and 27th of January, Vladimir Podrezov and Alexei Golov as well as Victor Kononov and Alexander Gudok were called up to the squad.

On 30 January, Victor Arhip was called up to the squad. On the 1st of February, Ramil Gaisin was called up to the squad.

On 7 February, Evgeny Mishechkin, Alexei Skobiola, Gleb Farkov, Kirill Golosnitsky, Vladislav Sozonov and Maxim Shevtsov were called up to the squad while Kirill Gotovtsev returned to his club.

Head Coach:  Dick Muir
 Caps updated: 8 February 2022

Current coaching staff
The current coaching staff of the Russian national team:

Past Coaches
Since 1992

Stadiums and attendance
The national team does not have a permanent home stadium and play their matches at various locations across Russia. After 2018 FIFA World Cup was held in Russia, the country received new large stadiums as a heritage. The Russian rugby union was given the opportunity to use these stadiums for the home games of the national team. The first big match took place in Moscow at VTB Arena as part of the warm-up to 2019 Rugby World Cup. In February 2020, Russia will host Portugal to the Kaliningrad Stadium.

The highest attended matches in Russia involving the Russian national team were:

Recent and upcoming fixtures
The following table shows the fixtures of the Russian national team in official test matches during the previous 12 months.

World Rugby Rankings

On introduction of the World Rugby Rankings in October 2003, Russia was ranked 23rd. As of March 2022, Russia was ranked 25th in the world.

Overall record
Below is a table of the representative rugby matches played by a Russia national XV at test level up until 06 November 2021.

Individual records

Most caps

Most tries

Most points

Other international teams

Sevens

Russia also has a rugby sevens team, which competes in several rounds each year on the World Rugby Sevens Series and in the FIRA-AER Grand Prix Sevens circuit, with Moscow hosting the second leg.

Women

Russia's women field national rugby union teams in both fifteens, where it appeared at the Women's Rugby World Cup in 1994 and 1998 as Russia and in 1991 as the USSR, and in sevens, which took part in the first Women's Rugby World Cup Sevens in 2009 and which contests the IRB Women's Sevens World Series.

See also

 CIS rugby union team
 USSR national rugby union team
 Russia national rugby league team

References

External links
 Rugby Union of Russia – Official Site

 
Rugby union in Russia
European national rugby union teams
Teams in European Nations Cup (rugby union)